Celadonite is a mica group mineral, a phyllosilicate of potassium, iron in both oxidation states, aluminium and hydroxide with formula .

It crystallizes in the monoclinic system and usually forms massive aggregates of prismatic crystallites or in dull clay masses. It is soft with a Mohs hardness of 2 and a specific gravity of 3. Typically occurs as dull gray-green to bluish green masses. It forms vesicle fillings and linings in altered basaltic lavas. Early research suggests this mineral has ties to weakly metamorphosed plutonic rocks during formation, and is also found with montmorillonite clays or zeolite crystals. Association with zeolites may indicate these minerals favor the same underlying conditions of crystal growth.

It was first described in 1847 on Monte Baldo, near Verona, Italy. The name is from the French celadon, for sea-green. It is one of two minerals, along with glauconite, used in making the pigment known as green earth.

Common impurities are manganese, calcium and sodium (previously known as natrium).

References

Potassium minerals
Iron(II,III) minerals
Magnesium minerals
Aluminium minerals
Mica group
Monoclinic minerals
Minerals in space group 5